Lepidosperma canescens (common name hoary rapier-sedge) is a sedge of the family Cyperaceae that is native to south-east South Australia and Victoria. There are no synonyms.

Description 
Lepidosperma canescens is a clump-forming perennial with short rhizomes. It has terete, rigid, erect, and smooth culms which are 25–100 cm by 0.8–2.0 mm. The leaf-blades are similar to the culms but usually shorter and from 0.7–2 mm in diameter. The sheaths are yellow-brown to dark grey-brown,  and are sometimes a dark reddish near the apex. They are not sticky. The inflorescences are fan-shaped to oblong. They are loose, erect, and 3–8 cm by about 2 cm.  The involucral bract is shorter than the inflorescence. The spikelets are 5–7 mm long. The nut is obovoid (2–3 mm by 1.0–1.3 mm),  and brown, smooth, and shining.

Uses 
This sedge was used by Aborigines for weaving artefacts, and is used by the aboriginal artist, Yvonne Koolmatrie, for her weaving.

References

External links
Lepidosperma canescens occurrence data from Australasian Virtual Herbarium
Lepidosperma canescens Seeds of South Australia (for images)
Lepidosperma canescens (Google image search)

Plants described in 1874
Flora of South Australia
canescens
Taxa named by Johann Otto Boeckeler
Flora of Victoria (Australia)